Manulea complana, the scarce footman, is a moth of the family Erebidae. The species was first described by Carl Linnaeus in his 1758 10th edition of Systema Naturae. It is found throughout the Palearctic region.

Technical description and variation

The wingspan is 28–35 mm. It is very like Eilema morosinum (Herrich-Schäffer, [1847]) but the forewing not so elongate, and the angles not so accentuated, the costal streak broader and brighter yellow, the hindwing duller, not so transparent; the apex of the abdomen brighter yellow. On the underside the disc is very blackish iron grey, and contrasts vividly with the orange-yellow costa and the broad pale yellow marginal area. Hindwing beneath pale yellow, the costa deeper yellow; below costa a grey streak from the base.

Biology
The moth flies from June to August depending on the location.

Larva blackish dorsally, with narrow lighter lines; subdorsal lines composed of small reddish yellow and white spots; lateral line interrupted, reddish yellow. The larvae feed on lichen and mosses, but also leaves of low growing plants on occasion.

References

External links

  Taxonomy
Eilema complana at Lepiforum e.V.

Moths described in 1758
Lithosiina
Moths of Asia
Moths of Europe
Taxa named by Carl Linnaeus